Bhubaneswar is the capital city of Odisha, India.  It was the ancient capital of the Kalinga Empire and the architectural legacy of the period is its greatest attraction.  There are many sites in the city that testify the importance of the region during the 7th to 11th century A.D when the Kalinga kings ruled Odisha and the regions beyond it.  The Ananta Vasudeva Temple and Vindusagar tank in the only temple of Vishnu in the city of Shiva.  The temples in Bhubaneswar are thus regarded as having been built from the 8th to 12th century of saivite influence.

The Jain and Buddhist shrines give a clear picture about the settlements around Bhubaneswar in the first two centuries B.C, and one of the most complete edicts of the Mauryan emperor, Ashoka, dating between 272-236 B.C, remains carved in rock just 5 miles to the southwest of the modern city.

References

Temples
Odisha
 
Lists of tourist attractions in Odisha